This is a list of 2017 American television debuts, being shows premiered in 2017.

Note that recorded premiere dates may since have changed depending on a variety of factors.

References

2017 in American television
2017-related lists
Mass media timelines by year